The western yellow-spotted barbet (Buccanodon dowsetti) is a bird species in the family Lybiidae. It is distributed in West Africa west of the Dahomey Gap, where it is found in Ivory Coast, Ghana, Guinea, Liberia, and Sierra Leone.

It was formerly considered conspecific with the eastern yellow-spotted barbet (B. duchaillui), but was split from it on account of their differing songs. The western yellow-spotted barbet has a song described by Nigel James Collar and Peter Boesman as "a series of 7–10 accelerating notes similar to a song of hairy-breasted barbet (Tricholaema hirsuta)" (phoneticized as "oop"), while the eastern yellow-spotted barbet has a song described by Collar and Boesman as a "characteristic purring (lasting 1–2 seconds), unique among [African] barbets" (phoneticized as "rrurrrrrr…"). These song differences led to the description of B. dowsetti as a distinct species.

References 

western yellow-spotted barbet
Birds of West Africa
Birds of the African tropical rainforest
western yellow-spotted barbet